Kent Johnson may refer to:
 Kent Johnson (poet)
 Kent Johnson (ice hockey)

See also
 Kent Johnston, American football coach